The following lists events that happened during 1885 in Australia.

Incumbents

Governors
Governors of the Australian colonies:
Governor of New South Wales – Lord Augustus Loftus (until 9 November), then Lord Carrington (from 12 December)
Governor of Queensland – Sir Anthony Musgrave
Governor of South Australia – Sir William Cleaver Francis Robinson, GCMG
Governor of Tasmania – Major Sir George Strahan
Governor of Victoria – Sir Henry Loch

Premiers
Premiers of the Australian colonies:
Premier of New South Wales – Alexander Stuart (until 6 October), then George Dibbs (until 9 October), then John Robertson (from 22 December)
Premier of Queensland – Samuel Griffith
Premier of South Australia – John Colton (until 16 June), then John Downer
Premier of Tasmania – Adye Douglas
Premier of Victoria – James Service

Events
 3 March – The New South Wales Contingent, consisting of an infantry battalion and an artillery battalion, leaves Sydney to fight in the Sudan Campaign.
 28 March – HMQS Gayundah arrives in Brisbane.
 1 April – The Cabinet of South Australia meets to discuss the "Russian scare"—the fear that South Australia would come under attack from Russian warships should hostilities between Russia and Britain over Afghanistan result in war.
 10 August – BHP, later to become the world's largest mining company, is registered as a company in Victoria.
 4–7 October – Third Intercolonial Trades Union Congress held in Sydney.
 The Geographical Society of Australasia sent an expedition to the Fly River region of Papua New Guinea, naming and exploring the Strickland River.

Science and technology
24 March – Hugh Victor McKay patents stripper-harvester.

Arts and literature

Tom Roberts paintings:
Winter morning after rain, Gardiner's Creek
The Artists Camp

Sport
20 February – The Richmond Football Club is formed.
3 November – Sheet Anchor wins the Melbourne Cup.
17 October – Caulfield Cup when 16 of the 44 horses competing fell, resulting in the death of 25-year-old jockey Donald Nicolson.

Births
8 January – John Curtin (died 1945), Australian Prime Minister
26 January – Michael Considine (died 1959), Australian politician
29 January – Arthur Halloway (died 1961), rugby league footballer and coach
20 March – Vernon Ransford (died 1958), cricketer
1 July – Dorothea Mackellar (died 1968), poet
12 August – Keith Murdoch (died 1952), journalist and newspaper publisher
15 August – Beaumont Smith (died 1950), film director and producer
18 August 
 Bede Fanning (died 1970), public servant
 Nettie Palmer (died 1964), poet and literary critic (wife of Vance Palmer)
28 August – Vance Palmer (died 1959), novelist, essayist and critic (husband of Nettie Palmer)
22 September – Ben Chifley (died 1951), Australian Prime Minister
15 October – Frank Hurley (died 1962), photographer and adventurer
7 November – Frank Cheadle, rugby league footballer and World War I soldier (died 1916).

Deaths
28 January – Edward Davy (born 1806), scientist

Notes

 
Australia
Years of the 19th century in Australia